"Faith" is a song by Canadian singer the Weeknd from his fourth studio album After Hours. The track was teased multiple times throughout the pre-release promotional material for the album, with the song's intro first being shown on February 13, 2020, through the After Hours teaser. Its second verse and outro were teased on the album's self-titled short film, which was released on March 4, 2020. The song was officially released on March 20, 2020, alongside the rest of its parent album. The Weeknd wrote and produced the song with Metro Boomin and Illangelo, with additional writing credits going to Canadian rapper Belly.

Background and release
In early February 2020, the Weeknd released the album teaser for After Hours, which featured the intro to the album's eighth track "Faith". Later on March 4, the album's self-titled short film was released, and it featured the second verse and outro of the aforementioned song. The studio version of the song was then released on March 20, alongside the rest of the album.

Lyrics and composition
During an After Hours listening session with Jem Aswad of Variety, the Weeknd shared the meaning behind "Faith".

When composing the track, the Weeknd admitted that although he didn't want to recall that period of his life, he felt as though he had to as an act of self-realization that he's no longer the person he once was. He also noted that the goal of the track was to make the audience feel uncomfortable when listening to it. "...I really wanted to get inside the head of the person who hates himself and hates life and hates the person who made him that way."

The song makes several references to the singles "Purple Rain" by Prince, "Losing My Religion" by R.E.M., and "Sicko Mode" by Travis Scott.

Critical reception
The song was noted as a being a highlight from the album by critics, with Max Cea from GQ calling it one of his masterworks in the realm of alternative R&B. Additionally, he applauds the Weeknd's writing and singing, as well as the production of the track, giving praise the song's outro which directly leads into "Blinding Lights". Jon Dolan from Rolling Stone also gave a positive review for the song, describing it as being magisterial and giving particular praise to the Weeknd's vocals and Metro Boomin's production. The song's synthwave sound also received comparisons to the work done by Kavinsky on his debut single "Nightcall".

Commercial performance
Following the releasing of its parent album, "Faith" debuted at number 45 on the US Billboard Hot 100 dated April 4, 2020. It was the twelfth highest charting track from After Hours.

Personnel
Credits adapted from Tidal. 
 The Weeknd – vocals, songwriting, production, keyboards, programming
 Metro Boomin – songwriting, production, keyboards, programming
 Illangelo – songwriting, production, keyboards, programming
 Belly – songwriting
 Dave Kutch – mastering
 Kevin Peterson – mastering

Charts

Release history

References

External links
 

2020 songs
The Weeknd songs
Alternative R&B songs
Songs written by Belly (rapper)
Songs written by the Weeknd
Song recordings produced by the Weeknd
Songs written by Metro Boomin
Song recordings produced by Metro Boomin
Songs written by Illangelo
Song recordings produced by Illangelo
Synthwave songs